Wrząca Wielka may refer to the following places in Poland:
Wrząca Wielka, Lower Silesian Voivodeship (south-west Poland)
Wrząca Wielka, Greater Poland Voivodeship (west-central Poland)